Flensing Icefall is a large icefall at the east side of the Bowers Mountains in Victoria Land, Antarctica, situated south of Platypus Ridge at the junction of Graveson Glacier and Rastorguev Glacier with Lillie Glacier. The icefall was so named by the northern party of the New Zealand Geological Survey Antarctic Expedition, 1963–64, because the icefall's longitudinal system of parallel crevassing resembles the carcass of a whale when being flensed. This glaciological feature lies situated on the Pennell Coast, a portion of Antarctica lying between Cape Williams and Cape Adare.

References 

Icefalls of Antarctica
Landforms of Victoria Land
Pennell Coast